The Association for Citizenship Teaching (ACT) is a professional subject association in the United Kingdom for those involved in citizenship education.  The association was founded by Sir Bernard Crick in 2001, to promote citizenship teaching to young people and provide support to citizenship teachers in England. The Honorary President is David Blunkett.

In 2017 the Board of Trustees appointed Liz Moorse the first Chief Executive of the charity.

Activities
The association's activities include:
 representing citizenship teachers and lobbying government for policies supporting citizenship teaching in schools
 supporting schools which follow the national curriculum for citizenship
 organising an annual conference for citizenship teachers each summer 
 offering advice on citizenship curriculum, pedagogy and GCSE Citizenship Studies
 providing training events and supporting local teacher networks
 publishing a journal, Teaching Citizenship, with articles, resources and information about the field

External links 
 Association for Citizenship Teaching
 

Educational charities based in the United Kingdom